Elmira is an unincorporated community in Stark County, Illinois, United States.

References

Unincorporated communities in Stark County, Illinois
Unincorporated communities in Illinois
Peoria metropolitan area, Illinois